Rodighiero or Rodighiéro is a patronymic surname with its roots in Lower Bavaria.

List of people with the surname 

 Daniel Rodighiéro (born 1940), retired French footballer
 Giulia Rodighiero, Italian astronomer
 Ralph Rodighiero (born 1963), American politician from West Virginia

See also 

Rodeghiero
Rodríguez (surname)

References

Surnames
Patronymic surnames
Surnames of German origin
Surnames of Italian origin
German-language surnames
Italian-language surnames